The Aero A.25 was a biplane military trainer aircraft developed in Czechoslovakia from the Aero A.11 reconnaissance-bomber and generally similar to the Aero A.21 night trainer.

Some A.25s were powered by the less powerful 134 kW (180 hp) Breitfeld & Danek Perun I engines, in which case they were designated Aero A.125.

Specifications (Aero A.25)

Operators
 Czechoslovakia.

See also

References

A025
Biplanes
Single-engined tractor aircraft
1920s Czechoslovakian military trainer aircraft